The 2026 Portuguese presidential election will be held in January. This election will elect the successor of President Marcelo Rebelo de Sousa, as he is barred from running for a third term.

Background and election procedure

Marcelo Rebelo de Sousa was re-elected in January 2021 with almost 61% of the votes on the first round. He took the oath of office on 9 March 2021, and continued the cohabitation with Socialist Prime Minister António Costa. In Portugal, the president is the head of state and has mostly ceremonial powers; however, the president has some political influence and can dissolve the Parliament of Portugal if a crisis occurs. The president also has an official residence in the Belém Palace in Lisbon.

To stand for election, candidates for the presidency each have to gather 7,500 signatures of support one month before the election, and submit them to the Constitutional Court of Portugal. Then, the Constitutional Court has to certify if the candidacies submitted meet the requirements to appear on the ballot. The highest number of candidacies ever accepted was ten, in 2016. Under Portuguese law, a candidate must receive a majority of votes (50% plus one vote) to be elected. If no candidate achieves a majority in the first round, a runoff election (i.e., second round, held between the two candidates who receive the most votes in the first round) has to be held.

Potential candidates 
Although these citizens have yet stated their intention to run for the election, there has been speculation in the media about they may do so:
Ana Gomes – former MEP of the Socialist Party (PS) (2014–2019); finished in second place in the previous presidential election
André Ventura – incumbent leader of CHEGA (since 2019); presidential candidate in the previous election
António Costa – secretary-general of the Socialist Party (PS) since 2014; incumbent prime minister since 2015
António Guterres – secretary-general of the United Nations since 2017; former prime minister (1995–2002); former secretary-general of the Socialist Party (PS) (1992–2002)
Augusto Santos Silva – President of the Assembly of the Republic (since 2022); minister in the 14th, 17th, 18th, 21st, 22nd governments
Fernando Medina – incumbent Minister of Finance (since 2022); former mayor of Lisbon (2015–2021)
Francisco Assis – former MEP of the Socialist Party (PS) (2004–2009; 2014–2019); former mayor of Amarante (1990–1995)
Francisco Louçã – former leader of the Left Bloc (BE) (1999–2012); candidate for the 2006 presidential election
Henrique Gouveia e Melo – chief of the Naval Staff since 2021; former coordinator of the COVID-19 Vaccination Plan Task Force (2021); former commander of the European Maritime Force (2017–2019); Portuguese Navy officer
João Cotrim de Figueiredo – former leader of the Liberal Initiative (IL) (2019–2023)
João Ferreira – former MEP of the Portuguese Communist Party (PCP) (2009–2021); presidential candidate in the previous election
José Castelo Branco – socialite
José Durão Barroso – former President of the European Commission (2004–2014); former prime minister (2002–2004); former Social Democratic Party (PSD) leader (1998–2004)
José Sócrates – former prime minister (2005–2011); former secretary-general of the Socialist Party (PS) (2004–2011)
Luís Marques Mendes – former Social Democratic Party (PSD) leader (2005–2007)
Mariana Mortágua – deputy from the Left Bloc (BE) since 2013
Mário Centeno – incumbent governor of the Bank of Portugal (since 2020); former President of the Eurogroup (2018–2020); former Minister of Finance (2015–2020)
Paulo Portas – former leader of CDS-People's Party (CDS-PP) (1998–2005, 2007–2016); deputy prime minister (2013–2015) and minister in the 15th, 16th, 19th and 20th governments
Pedro Passos Coelho – former prime minister (2011–2015); former Social Democratic Party (PSD) leader (2010–2018)
Pedro Santana Lopes – incumbent mayor of Figueira da Foz since 2021 (also in 1998–2002); former prime minister (2004–2005); former Social Democratic Party (PSD) leader (2004–2005)
Rui Moreira – incumbent mayor of Porto since 2013
Rui Rio – former Social Democratic Party (PSD) leader (2018–2022)
Tiago Mayan – incumbent President of the Parish of Aldoar, Foz do Douro e Nevogilde since 2021; presidential candidate in the previous election

Official candidate 
For the moment, only one candidate has confirmed his candidacy for the presidential elections of 2026, the entrepreneur Patrick Martins of the famous Green Swallow case, where the judicial police confirmed the return of 40kgs of Cannabis Sativa L. to Patrick Martins, a world first. 

After the various charges of drug trafficking from the Public Ministery relating to his activities in the hemp sector, Patrick Martins said he was shocked by the functioning of certain state institutions and felt the need to upset the political order he obsolete judge, in order to protect the democracy.

Patrick Martins launched his online campaign site: www.patrick2026.com, and began collecting his 7,500 citizen signatures for his candidacy.

Patrick Martins – Entrepreneur - Founder and CEO of Green Swallow Franchise and THOTH Business & Consulting Ltd.

Opinion polling

First round

Graphic summary

Polling

Approval ratings

Graphical summary

Polling
The table below lists the evolution of public opinion on the President's performance in office.

See also
 Politics of Portugal
 President of Portugal

Notes

References

External links
 Official results site, Portuguese Justice Ministry
 Portuguese Electoral Commission
 ERC – Official publication of polls

2026
Future elections in Portugal